= Portrait of Charles of Bourbon in Hunting Dress =

Painting by Antonio Sebastiani

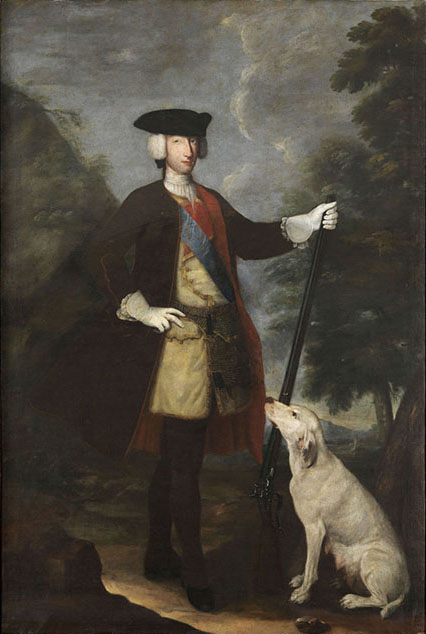

Portrait of Charles of Bourbon in Hunting Dress is an oil on canvas painting by Antonio Sebastiani, likely produced in the 1730s either whilst Charles was still in the Duchy of Parma and Piacenza or at the latest during the early years of his rule of Naples and Sicily - Sebastiani was the court painter. It is now in Room 32 of the National Museum of Capodimonte in Naples, part of the building's former royal apartments.

== Sources ==
- Mario Sapio, Il Museo di Capodimonte, Napoli, Arte'm, 2012. ISBN 978-88-569-0303-4
- https://web.archive.org/web/20150128133836/http://cir.campania.beniculturali.it/museodicapodimonte/itinerari-tematici/galleria-di-immagini/OA900472
- Touring Club Italiano, Museo di Capodimonte, Milano, Touring Club Editore, 2012. ISBN 978-88-365-2577-5
